Gordon Kenneth Rich-Phillips (born 8 July 1974) is a former Australian politician. He was a Liberal Party member of the Victorian Legislative Council between 1999 and 2022, representing the Eumemmerring Province (1999–2006) and the South Eastern Metropolitan Region (2006–2022).

First elected at the age of 25, he was the youngest person elected to the Legislative Council. He was Assistant Treasurer, Minister for Technology and Minister for the Aviation Industry from 2010 to 2014, serving in the Baillieu and Napthine governments. He was elected Deputy Leader of the Liberal Party in the Legislative Council in December 2014.

Early life
Rich-Phillips was educated at Eumemmering Secondary College, where he was school dux. He studied aerospace engineering at RMIT University and Monash University, and subsequently studied business at Monash University. He worked in economic research and analysis before entering politics, and was aviation manager for the Department of State Development at the time of his election. He also holds a commercial pilot's license, and was actively involved in a number of campaigns with the Aircraft Owners and Pilots Association of Australia.

He was elected to the Legislative Council for Eumemmerring Province at the 1999 state election, succeeding retiring Liberal Ron Wells. He transferred to the new South Eastern Metropolitan Region upon the reorganisation of the Legislative Council in 2002. Rich-Phillips was elected secretary of the parliamentary Liberal Party in 2002, and served as Liberal spokesperson for sport and recreation (2002–2004), Commonwealth Games (2002–2005), and manufacturing and exports (2004–2005). He was promoted to shadow cabinet in December 2005, and served as shadow minister for finance, the Transport Accident Commission and Commonwealth Games (2005–2006), finance (2006–2007 and 2008–2009) information technology (2007–2010), community development (2008–2010), and assistant shadow treasurer, shadow minister for the aviation industry and shadow minister for federal/state relations (2009–2010).

Rich-Phillips was appointed Assistant Treasurer, Minister for WorkCover, Minister for the Aviation Industry and Minister for Technology upon the Liberal-National coalition victory at the 2010 state election.

On 17 June 2022, Rich-Phillips announced that he would not be recontesting his seat at the 2022 Victorian state election.

References

External links
 Parliamentary voting record of Gordon Rich-Phillips at Victorian Parliament Tracker
 Liberal Party biography

1974 births
Living people
Liberal Party of Australia members of the Parliament of Victoria
Politicians from Melbourne
Members of the Victorian Legislative Council
Members of the Victorian Legislative Council for Eumemmerring Province
Members of the Victorian Legislative Council for South Eastern Metropolitan Region
RMIT University alumni
Monash University alumni
21st-century Australian politicians
People from Dandenong, Victoria